The Abu Dhabi United Group for Development and Investment (ADUG) is a United Arab Emirates (UAE) based private equity company. It is owned by Sheikh Mansour bin Zayed Al Nahyan, member of the Abu Dhabi Royal Family and Minister of Presidential Affairs for the UAE. Leaks of internal documents show that the Abu Dhabi government manages the accounts belonging to ADUG. ADUG insists it is separate from the Abu Dhabi government.

The primary interest of the group is its 81% majority ownership of City Football Group, a worldwide organisation most notably controlling Manchester City F.C., Mumbai City FC, Melbourne City FC  and New York City FC, as well as several other international football clubs. However, it also holds interests in various other endeavours outside of the sporting world with an extensive property portfolio in the United Arab Emirates and Manchester.

City Football Group 

The Group was founded in the summer of 2008, as Sheikh Mansour looked to take over Manchester City Football Club from the former Prime Minister of Thailand Thaksin Shinawatra and signed off the deal on 1 September 2008, with due diligence completed on 23 September the same year.

Sulaiman Al-Fahim was the public face of ADUG during the initial phase of the takeover - a larger-than-life figure often described as the "Donald Trump of Abu Dhabi".  On completion of the takeover, Al-Fahim generated considerable attention in the footballing world with promises of grandiose spending plans to capture the world's greatest footballing talents. Although he did bring in the Brazilian Robinho from Real Madrid on the same day on which the takeover was agreed, one week after ADUG took control of the club Al-Fahim was removed from his role to be replaced by Khaldoon al-Mubarak, who remains in position to the present day.

In 2011, Manchester City qualified for the Champions League and won the FA Cup, providing the club their first success in over three decades following ADUG's support. In 2012, the club won the Premier League, their first league title in forty-four years.

Following the success of the Manchester club, ADUG began investment into other football clubs. After founding the MLS side New York City FC and purchasing the A-League franchise Melbourne Heart FC (shortly afterwards renamed Melbourne City FC), it was deemed necessary to create a new infrastructure to manage the various worldwide footballing ventures, and to keep them separate from non-footballing business. For this purpose, City Football Group was created in 2014 to oversee all of the teams under their control, acting as holding company not only to the football teams but to several businesses designed to market football services to the wider market. In return, ADUG became the holding company for CFG.

ADUG have diluted their shareholding the City Football Group on two occasions in 2015 and 2019 to the approximate value of £654 million. As of 2020, they own 78% of the City Football Group.  Since July 2021, CFG has been managed under Newton Investment and Development LLC, another company wholly owned by Sheikh Mansour.

Other business interests 

ADUG also have an extensive property portfolio in the United Arab Emirates and abroad. Aside from Manchester City F.C., ADUG have amassed investments totalling nearly £1 billion in Manchester, mainly in property and higher education sectors. Aside from purchasing assets for their own control, ADUG signed a ten-year partnership with Manchester City Council to revamp the east end of the city - not coincidentally the same area in which Manchester City are based - creating the Manchester Life Development Company in conjunction with the council in order to build 6,000 affordable houses in the area.

Criticism

According to Human Rights Watch, ADUG's investment in Manchester City enabled Abu Dhabi to "construct a public relations image of a progressive, dynamic Gulf state, which deflects attention from what is really going on in the country."

See also

Manchester City F.C. ownership and finances
City Football Group

References

Manchester City F.C.
Holding companies of the United Arab Emirates
Holding companies established in 2008
2008 establishments in the United Arab Emirates